The California Cup Juvenile Stakes is an American thoroughbred horse race run annually at Santa Anita Park in Arcadia, California during its Oak Tree Racing Association meet in the fall of the year. Raced on dirt over a distance of 1 1/16 miles, it open to two-year-old colts bred in the state of California. The event currently offers a purse of $125,000 and a trophy.

The California Cup Juvenile Stakes is part of the "California Cup Day" series of races intended to call attention to, and to honor, the California Thoroughbred racing and breeding industry.

Past winners

 2011 - Rousing Sermon (Rafael Bejarano)
 2010 - Slammer Time
 2009 - Bench the Judge (Reyes C. Santiago)
 2008 - Lucky Primo (Joel Rosario)
 2007 - Sierra Sunset (Russell Baze) 
 2006 - Freesgood
 2005 - Bright Maneuvers
 2004 - Texcess
 2003 - He's the Rage
 2002 - Crackup
 2001 - Yougottawanna
 2000 - Proud Tower
 1999 - Sparcelink
 1998 - Sunday Stroll
 1997 - Ex Marks the Cop
 1996 - Carmen's Baby
 1995 - Cavonnier
 1994 - Fandarel Dancer
 1993 - Flying Sensation
 1992 - Boating Pleasure
 1991 - Ebonair
 1990 - Crystal's Game

External links
 Oak Tree racing meet at Santa Anita
 The California Cup Juvenile Stakes at Pedigree Query.com

Horse races in California
Santa Anita Park
Graded stakes races in the United States
Flat horse races for two-year-olds
Racing series for horses